Blonti is a village in Blonti Parish, Ludza Municipality in the Latgale region of Latvia.

References

Towns and villages in Latvia
Ludza Municipality
Latgale